Dr Colossus is an Australian rock metal band from Melbourne. The band mix doom metal with lyrical references to episodes of The Simpsons. In May 2021, the band released their second studio album, which debuted at number 16 on the ARIA charts.

History

2014-2016 : Early years and formation
Jono Colliver and Nathan Johnston met playing in a high school rock band called Emprica and continued playing in bands such as Honeytrap and Kashmere Club for twelve years, prior to forming Dr Colossus. It was on tour in Tasmania with Honeytrap in 2011 that the seeds of what would become Dr Colossus were planted. Colliver recalls, "We were going to start a doom band and we were like, 'What's the heaviest name for this band? What's just a massive, dumb, heavy, big thing?" and after deliberating names such as monolith, colossal or colossus, Colliver said "'Why don't we name the band after Dr Colossus from The Simpsons?'" which led to Johnston saying "Well why don't we just make all the songs about The Simpsons?'" Colliver told the ABC that for the next couple of years, the idea of a "Simpsons-themed doom-metal band" refused to dislodge itself from their minds.

In early 2014, Johnston had dedicated his time to Kashmere Club, while Colliver has toured the world as Vance Joy's bassist and during down time, the duo recorded a three-track extended play, titled IV, and distributed it to various music blogs and labels. Germany label Totem Manufacture Records released a limited edition on cassette.

In 2015, another Simpsons-themed metal band Okilly Dokilly, launched and went viral, with the band recalling "We were like 'Awww, that sucks'. We thought … that was our only chance and they've nabbed it from us."

The band released further singles were released in 2015 which were compiled on the 2016 album, Death Mountain Collection.

2017-present: studio albums
In 2017, Colliver and Johnston added a third member, bass player Mike Findlay, and started a crowdfunding campaign that easily eclipsed its target. They recorded their debut album, The Dank which was released in September 2017.

In November 2017, Nathan Johnston died in his sleep. After some grieving time, Colliver and Findlay struggled with the sense there was "some unfinished business with Dr Colossus that Nath would have wanted to be finished" and they called in one of Nathan's longtime friends Josh Eales to take his place on drums, as well as Jono's brother Joel as an extra guitarist, with the idea of playing some tribute shows to honour Nathan's memory.

In July 2019, the band released the single, "Sixty-Six & Six", their first new music in two years and an Australian tour with Okilly Dokilly. "Sixty-Six & Six" tells the tale of Rod and Todd Flanders and their firm stance on not going to church. 

In February 2020 the band toured with Okilly Dokilly in Australia

In March 2021, the band announced the forthcoming released of their second studio album, alongside the single "Pickabar", which references the story of when Homer forgets to pick Bart up from soccer practice. The album was released on 22 May 2021 and debuted at number 16 on the ARIA Charts.

Personnel

Current members
Jono Colliver – lead vocals, guitar (2014–present)
Mike Findlay – bass (2017–present)
Josh Eales - drums (2018–present)
Joel Colliver - guitar (2018–present)

Former members
Nathan Johnston – drums (2014–d. 2017)

Discography

Studio albums

Compilation albums

Extended plays

Singles

Awards and nominations

Music Victoria Awards
The Music Victoria Awards, are an annual awards night celebrating Victorian music. They commenced in 2005.

! 
|-
| 2021
| Best Heavy Act
| Dr Colossus
| 
|
|-

References

Musical groups established in 2014
Australian musical groups
2014 establishments in Australia